The Derelict Air Museum was an Australian aviation museum located in Launching Place, Victoria.

It was a collection of aircraft in various states of repair, owned by Richard Wetherburn. The exhibits included a US Air Force North American F-86D Sabre, two Royal Australian Air Force (RAAF) Aermacchi MB-326, an RAAF de Havilland Vampire, a Royal Australian Navy Westland Wessex, a Polish Air Force PZL TS-11 Iskra, a GAF Nomad, a Beechcraft Queen Air, a Commonwealth Department of Health de Havilland Dove, and the nose of an Ansett Australia Fokker F-28 Fellowship. The museum also had a large collection of model aircraft.

Prior to 2017, it was closed and dismantled.

References

External links
 Official website 
 Facebook
 Video of the museum

Aerospace museums in Australia
Military and war museums in Australia